Elaphoglossum nervosum, the veined tongue-fern, is a herbaceous plant, a member of the Dryopteridaceae family.

Description 
It is a fern with short, scaly, black, sterile leaves approximately 12-25 cm long.

Distribution 
It is an endemic species to St. Helena.

Taxonomy 
It was named by Jean Baptiste Bory de Saint-Vincent,. In: Mon. 50, t. 13. in 1899.

References

External links 

 https://www.pteridoportal.org/portal/taxa/index.php?taxon=Elaphoglossum%20nervosum
 https://plantsandplanter.org/viewer.php?type=specimen&institute=Carolina&number=102108&search=Harvey%2C-W.

Dryopteridaceae